Vágner Benazzi de Andrade (born 17 July 1954), is a Brazilian professional football coach and former player who last managed Nacional-AM. 

A right back, he spent most of his 13-year playing career in São Paulo, where he represented several teams.

Coaching career
Born in Osasco, Benazzi made his coaching debuts with Grêmio Sãocarlense, his last professional club, in 1989. With the club he also won the Campeonato Paulista Série A3.

After being highly known for taking lower clubs to promotion places, Benazzi joined Avaí in 2006, helping the club to achieve a place in 2007 Copa do Brasil. He subsequently moved to Portuguesa, being promoted with the club and also winning the Campeonato Paulista Série A2.

On 10 October 2010, after managing Ponte Preta, Vila Nova and Portuguesa, Benazzi returned to Avaí, with the club narrowly avoiding relegation in the year's Campeonato Brasileiro Série A. On 14 February of the following year, however, he was relieved from his duties.

Benazzi also managed Bahia, and after being dismissed joined fierce rivals Vitória, leaving the latter in December 2011. He was later in charge of Botafogo-SP, Bragantino (two stints) Atlético Sorocaba, Paysandu, Comercial-SP and Guarani. He rescinded with the latter on 14 September, joining Portuguesa a day after.

Honours
São Carlense
 Campeonato Paulista Série A3: 1989

 Taquaritinga
 Campeonato Paulista Série A2: 1992

 Portuguesa Santista
 Campeonato Paulista Série A2: 1998

Gama 
 Campeonato Brasiliense: 1998, 2000
 Campeonato Brasileiro Série B: 1998

 Figueirense
 Campeonato Catarinense: 2001, 2003

 Fortaleza
 Campeonato Cearense: 2005

References

External links
Ogol profile 
Official website 

 

1954 births
Living people
People from Osasco
Brazilian footballers
Brazilian football managers
Campeonato Brasileiro Série A managers
Campeonato Brasileiro Série B managers
Campeonato Brasileiro Série C managers
Campeonato Brasileiro Série D managers
Nacional Atlético Clube (SP) players
Associação Portuguesa de Desportos players
Operário Futebol Clube (MS) players
Sampaio Corrêa Futebol Clube players
Esporte Clube Juventude players
Esporte Clube XV de Novembro (Jaú) players
Comercial Futebol Clube (Ribeirão Preto) players
Sociedade Esportiva Palmeiras players
São José Esporte Clube players
Grêmio Esportivo Sãocarlense managers
Comercial Futebol Clube (Ribeirão Preto) managers
União Agrícola Barbarense Futebol Clube managers
Clube Atlético Bragantino managers
Paulista Futebol Clube managers
Esporte Clube Paraguaçuense managers
Sociedade Esportiva do Gama managers
São José Esporte Clube managers
Esporte Clube Santo André managers
Clube Atlético Sorocaba managers
Figueirense FC managers
Clube Náutico Capibaribe managers
Brasiliense Futebol Clube managers
Criciúma Esporte Clube managers
Paysandu Sport Club managers
Fortaleza Esporte Clube managers
Joinville Esporte Clube managers
Avaí FC managers
Associação Portuguesa de Desportos managers
Associação Atlética Ponte Preta managers
Vila Nova Futebol Clube managers
Esporte Clube Bahia managers
Esporte Clube Vitória managers
Botafogo Futebol Clube (SP) managers
Guarani FC managers
Nacional Futebol Clube managers
Association football fullbacks
Footballers from São Paulo (state)